Ronald Gordon "Ron" Stevens, Q.C. (September 17, 1949 – May 13, 2014) was a Canadian politician.  He was a member of the Legislative Assembly of Alberta representing the constituency of Calgary-Glenmore as a Progressive Conservative until his resignation on May 15, 2009. He was subsequently appointed a Judge of the Court of Queen's Bench of Alberta on May 20, 2009, by the government of Canada.

Early life

Stevens was born September 17, 1949, in Empress, Alberta. He graduated from the University of Calgary in 1971 with a Bachelor of Arts degree in political science and went on to obtain a Bachelor of Laws degree in 1975 from the University of Alberta. Prior to being elected into the Legislative Assembly of Alberta, Stevens worked as a civil litigation lawyer and mediator with a major law firm in Calgary. In 1996, he was appointed Queen's Council.

An active community member, Stevens served in the role of president of the Palliser Bayview Pumphill Community Association, director of the Community Mediation Calgary Society, director of the Federation of Calgary Communities, and director and vice chair of the Calgary Housing Authority.

Political career 

Stevens first sought public office in the 1997 provincial election in the constituency of Calgary-Glenmore. In that election, he received 58% of the vote. In the 2001 provincial election that followed, Stevens was reelected with 68% of the popular vote. That same year, he was appointed by Premier Ralph Klein as Minister of Gaming and was responsible for the Alberta Gaming and Liquor Commission and the Alberta Lottery Fund. Following the 2004 provincial election, where he received 50% of the vote, Stevens was sworn in as Minister of Justice and Attorney General. On June 27, 2007, he was named Alberta's Deputy Premier by newly elected Premier Ed Stelmach. In the 2008 provincial election, Stevens was elected for a fourth time receiving 51% of the vote. On March 12, 2008, he was sworn in as Minister of International and Intergovernmental Relations.

Since becoming an MLA, Stevens has served in a variety of capacities on numerous boards and committees.  He has held the title of Deputy Government House Leader, the position of chair for the Legislative Review Committee, the Oil Sands Ministerial Strategy Committee (Radke Report), Health Information Legislation Committee, the Standing Policy Committee on Learning, the Private Schools Funding Task Force, the Non-Profit Tax Exemption Review Committee, the position of vice chair of the Agenda and Priorities Committee and the Standing Policy Committee on Justice and Government Services, and the position of deputy chair of the Select Special Freedom of Information and Protection of Privacy Act Review Committee. He has also served as a member of more than ten other committees.

As an MLA, Stevens successfully sponsored two governmental bills: the Holocaust Memorial Day and Genocide Remembrance Act and the Irrigation Districts Act. He also sponsored one private member's bill during his first term in office: the Emblems of Alberta (Alberta Dress Tartan) Amendment Act, 2000.

Currently, in addition to his responsibilities as MLA, Minister, and Deputy Premier, Stevens serves as a member of Treasury Board, the Agenda and Priorities Committee, and the Privileges and Elections, Standing Orders and Printing Committee.

Hawaiian Stopover Controversy 

In October 2007, CBC News Calgary reported that Ron Stevens had used his government credit card to pay for drinks and meals for his wife and four other people while on a stopover in Hawaii in 2003.

At the time, Stevens was serving as Alberta's Gaming Minister. His three-day Hawaiian stopover occurred as he was returning from Australia where he had been studying that country's gaming system.

"I don't recall whether it was a three-day stop or not," Stevens told CBC when questioned about the trip. "But I do recall that we did it in that fashion because it was less expensive than flying business class. In other words, it was the most economic way of doing it."

Personal life

Stevens was married to Phyllis. The couple had two children together. He died of natural causes on May 13, 2014, at the age of 64.

Election results

References 

1949 births
2014 deaths
Members of the Executive Council of Alberta
Politicians from Calgary
Progressive Conservative Association of Alberta MLAs
University of Alberta Faculty of Law alumni
21st-century Canadian politicians